War Machine is a 2017 American satirical war comedy film directed and written by David Michôd and starring Brad Pitt, Anthony Michael Hall, Anthony Hayes, Topher Grace, Will Poulter, Tilda Swinton, and Ben Kingsley. Based on the nonfiction book The Operators: The Wild and Terrifying Inside Story of America's War in Afghanistan by Michael Hastings, it is a fictionalized version of the events in the book based on United States Army General Stanley McChrystal.

The film was released on Netflix on May 26, 2017.

Plot
In the summer of 2009, four-star General Glen McMahon, having won renown for his effective leadership in Iraq, is sent to Afghanistan to prepare a strategic assessment so that the government can end the ongoing war. He is given wide latitude to write it, on the sole condition that he not request more troops. 

McMahon and his staff, particularly his right hand man Major General Greg Pulver, are united in their belief that the war can be won, and decide to recommend that President Obama authorize a surge of 40,000 additional troops to secure Helmand province in order to stabilize the country. However, the Secretary of State informs McMahon that, because he requested more troops, and such a surge is incompatible with upcoming elections, McMahon's report will not be reviewed until after Afghanistan's presidential election.

Captain Badi Basim, a member of the Afghan National Army, joins McMahon's staff as a "representative" of the Afghan people. He arrives in civilian clothes as he does not wish to wear his uniform, which he has in a bag, because of the risk of being killed. Meanwhile, McMahon is informed that due to massive voter fraud in the recent election, a runoff election will have to be held, further delaying the review of the assessment. Fed up, McMahon secretly leaks the assessment to The Washington Post and organizes an interview with 60 Minutes, during which he reveals that, in the last 70 days he has only been granted one meeting with President Obama. 

In response, Obama announces that he will send 30,000 troops to Afghanistan, but that all U.S. and coalition forces in the country will leave in 18 months, infuriating McMahon and his staff for telegraphing America's Afghan strategy to the Taliban in Afghanistan. To gather the remaining 10,000 troops needed for his strategy to work, McMahon and his men head to Paris to negotiate with the other coalition nations.

In Paris, McMahon learns that the President is in Denmark and wishes to meet with him. The ambassador to Afghanistan warns McMahon that he needs to understand President Obama's position: if McMahon continues to anger the President, he will be fired for insubordination. The President, however, merely shakes McMahon's hand as he climbs aboard Air Force One, supposedly due to time constraints. McMahon and his staff attend a dinner in McMahon's honor, accompanied by Rolling Stone writer Sean Cullen, who intends to write a feature story about his performance for an upcoming issue. The next day, during their wedding anniversary dinner, McMahon's wife Jeanie confronts him about how much time he's been spending fighting abroad instead of being with his family back home.

While en route to Berlin with McMahon's staff to continue negotiations, Cullen observes their behavior when "out of country" and concludes that they are arrogant, seem to care little about the growing public perception that the war is costly and unwinnable, and hold civilian leadership in contempt. At a conference to discuss his strategy, McMahon is confronted by a German official who criticizes the war and McMahon's strategy. Nevertheless, both the Germans and the French agree to furnish the troops needed for McMahon's planned offensive, codenamed "Operation Moshtarak", to proceed, with Afghan President Hamid Karzai's approval.

The operation launches, but soon runs into trouble when several civilians are accidentally killed. When McMahon holds a public meeting with locals to apologize for the incident and explain that the U.S. is fighting the war for the benefit of Afghans, the crowd grows hostile and asks McMahon and his troops to leave.

McMahon later learns that Cullen's article has been published, and realizes it paints a negative picture of him and his staff as openly speaking against the President and mishandling the war effort. The President calls McMahon to Washington. Knowing that he will be fired for his actions, McMahon returns to Washington and later takes a job as a civilian consultant.

In the aftermath, Cullen ponders the consequences of his article, noting that he wished McMahon's fall would finally convince the government to stop invading foreign countries and end the war in Afghanistan. Instead the government simply assigns a new general to replace McMahon.

Cast 
McMahon's Entourage
 Brad Pitt as General Glen McMahon, a character based on General Stanley McChrystal. He is portrayed as an accomplished general with degrees from West Point and Yale University, brought in to bring a resolution to the conflict in Afghanistan.
 Anthony Hayes as Lieutenant Commander Pete Duckman, a Navy SEAL and member of McMahon's staff
 Emory Cohen as Sergeant Willy Dunne, General McMahon's body man
 RJ Cyler as USAF Tech Sergeant Andy Moon, information technology support assistant
 Daniel Betts as USN Rear Admiral Simon Ball, McMahon's Senior Public Affairs Officer
 Topher Grace as Matt Little, a former lobbyist turned McMahon's civilian media adviser, based loosely on Duncan Boothby
 Anthony Michael Hall as Major General Greg Pulver, ISAF Director of Intelligence, loosely based on Lieutenant General Michael Flynn
 John Magaro as Colonel Cory Staggart, an Army Ranger and General McMahon's executive officer
 Aymen Hamdouchi as Captain Badi Basim, a scholarly Afghan National Army officer who becomes General McMahon's aide-de-camp
 Scoot McNairy as Sean Cullen, a cynical journalist for Rolling Stone who accompanies McMahon and his staff and acts as narrator throughout the film, loosely based on author Michael Hastings
 Meg Tilly as Jeanie McMahon, Glen McMahon's wife

U.S. Diplomats
 Sian Thomas as United States Secretary of State Edith May, based on Hillary Rodham Clinton
 Alan Ruck as Lieutenant General Pat McKinnon, United States Ambassador to Afghanistan, loosely based on Lieutenant General Karl Eikenberry
 Nicholas Jones as Dick Waddle, loosely based on Special Representative for Afghanistan and Pakistan Richard Holbrooke
 Griffin Dunne as Ray Canucci, a United States Department of State senior official

Politicians
 Ben Kingsley as President Hamid Karzai
 Reggie Brown as President Barack Obama
 Tilda Swinton as a German politician

Combat Marines
 Will Poulter as Sergeant Ricky Ortega, a Marine Corps infantry squad leader
 Lakeith Stanfield as Corporal Billy Cole, a disillusioned Marine and member of Ortega's squad.
 Josh Stewart as Captain Dick North, a Marine Corps officer

Other cast members
 Rufus Wright as British Army Lieutenant Colonel Frank Groom 
 Georgina Rylance as Lydia Cunningham, 60 Minutes journalist
 Russell Crowe as General Bob White (uncredited), General Glen McMahon's replacement, similar to David Petraeus

Production 
On April 27, 2012, it was announced that New Regency and Plan B Entertainment had acquired the film adaptation rights to the 2011 best seller non-fiction book The Operators by Michael Hastings. On April 14, 2014, David Michôd was hired to write and direct the film based on the war in Afghanistan. Brad Pitt was attached to star as General Stanley McChrystal and produce the film along with his Plan B partners Dede Gardner and Jeremy Kleiner, while the film would be financed by New Regency and RatPac Entertainment.
 
On June 8, 2015, Netflix acquired the distribution rights to the film which was re-titled War Machine, while Ian Bryce also came on board to produce the film along with others. On June 17, The Hollywood Reporter revealed that there had been a budget issue between New Regency and RatPac with producers of Plan B, and thus Netflix had stepped in to buy the distribution rights for $60 million.

On August 4, 2015, Emory Cohen was cast in the film to play a member of Gen. McChrystal's staff. On August 10, 2015, Topher Grace joined the film to play Gen. Stanley McChrystal's civilian press adviser. On August 11, 2015, John Magaro signed on to play Cory Burger, a special ops soldier and close advisor to General McMahon. On August 14, 2015, Scoot McNairy joined the cast of the film. On August 19, 2015, Anthony Michael Hall was added to the cast to play General Hank Pulver, loosely based on General Mike Flynn. On August 20, 2015, LaKeith Stanfield signed on to the film. The same day, Will Poulter also joined the cast for an unspecified role. On August 25, Anthony Hayes joined the film. On October 23, 2015, TheWrap revealed that RJ Cyler had also joined the film.

Filming 
Principal photography on the film began in mid-October 2015 in London. Later on October 19, filming began in Abu Dhabi; the city was transformed into Kabul, streets into a military fortress, an old building as an American Embassy in Kabul, and a street as a Palestinian border crossing. Filming also took place at the Abu Dhabi International Airport in November. In mid-November 2015, while final scenes were being shot, actors were spotted filming in Ras al-Khaimah and the city's old neighborhood was transformed into Pakistani villages and a military base-camp. The film’s final scene filmed in Sydney Airport’s International Terminal arrival hall, is a cameo appearance by Russel Crowe, a Sydney resident, along with other Australian Dan Wyllie. The scene displays pitch black windows as it was filmed during the airports 11pm to 6am shutdown and curfew.

Release
The film was released on Netflix on May 26, 2017.

Marketing
Brad Pitt visited Mumbai to promote the film and attended a special screening at PVR High Street Phoenix on May 24, 2017.  He also met Bollywood star Shah Rukh Khan to promote War Machine.

Critical response
On the review aggregator website Rotten Tomatoes, the film has an approval rating of 47% based on 97 reviews, and an average rating of 5.64/10. The website's critical consensus reads, "War Machines uneven execution keeps its fact-based story from cleanly hitting its targets, but those flaws are frequently offset by sharp wit and solid acting." On Metacritic, which assigns a normalized rating, the film has a 56 out of 100 score, based on 30 critics, indicating "mixed or average reviews".

References

External links 
 
 
 
The Operators by Michael Hastings at Google Books

Films directed by David Michôd
Films shot in London
Films shot in Abu Dhabi
Films set in Afghanistan
Films based on non-fiction books
Films based on military novels
Films set in 2010
2010s satirical films
War films based on actual events
Drama films based on actual events
Comedy films based on actual events
American war comedy films
2010s war comedy films
Plan B Entertainment films
Films produced by Brad Pitt
War in Afghanistan (2001–2021) films
American political films
Films about military personnel
Films shot in Surrey
Films scored by Nick Cave
Films scored by Warren Ellis (musician)
English-language Netflix original films
2017 films
Films about the United States Army
Films shot in the Emirate of Ras Al Khaimah
Cultural depictions of Barack Obama
Films about American military personnel
2017 comedy films
Films produced by Ian Bryce
2010s English-language films
2010s American films